The Leader of the Opposition is an official role usually occupied by the leader of the second largest party in the Northern Territory Legislative Assembly. In the event that that party or coalition wins an election, the Leader of the Opposition will most likely become the Chief Minister.

While the Legislative Assembly was created in 1974, there was no parliamentary opposition for the first three-year term, as every seat was held by the government, with the exception of two that were won by independents.

2020 Opposition Leadership dispute

On 18 March 2020 Terry Mills claimed to have become Opposition Leader on the basis of the Territory Alliance now having three MLAs to the Country Liberal Party's two.  No motion acknowledging a change in the office was passed by the Assembly.  On 24 March 2020 Mills presented a shadow Cabinet to the Assembly and was initially referred to as Leader of the Opposition, without formal motion.  However later that day Lia Finocchiaro moved that the office of Leader of the Opposition be declared vacant as it was "unclear" who the "official opposition" was, and that a secret ballot between the two be held to determine Opposition Leader status.  The motion was passed and Finocchiaro won the ballot 5-3, with Labor MLAs present not voting.

References

Northern Territory